The AGS-30 Atlant is a Russian automatic grenade launcher currently in production in Russia and in service with the Russian armed forces.

Description
Designed on the basis of AGS-17, the AGS-30 provides better mobility, longer range and better accuracy during firing. Significantly lighter than its previous version, the AGS-30 weighs 30 kg loaded, meaning it can be carried by one person. Using a specially designed GPD-30 grenade, the AGS-30 can engage targets at 2100m. Recoil is lessened with a smoother grenade ejection mechanism. An adjustable SAG-30 tripod mount (GRAU index 6P17) is also included.

Development
After the success of the AGS-17 in Afghanistan, the KBP Instrument Design Bureau began work on a new grenade launcher. The Russian army needed a weapon that could easily flush militants out of their fortified building hideouts. The new design proved to be effective, and it was officially adopted in 2002, and was later adopted by the Russian Interior Ministry Troops.

Ammunition
The AGS-30 is fed from special belt drums that hold 29 linked rounds. The Loaded belt drum weighs about 14 kg. Spade grips are installed on a gun cradle integral to the tripod, instead of to the gun body. The AGS-30 can only fire in fully automatic. Standard sighting equipment is a 2.7X magnification PAG-17 optical sight.

AGS-30 uses standard VOG-17M, enhanced fragmentation VOG-30, VOG-30D and extended range GPD-30 grenades.
 VOG-17M (HE)
 IO-30 (HE)
 IO-30TP (Practice)
 VOG-30 (HE)
 VOG-30D (HE)
 VUS-30 (Smoke)
 GPD-30 (HE)

Variants
 AG-30M – Vehicle mounted version with electric trigger mechanism.

Users

See also
 AGS‑40 Balkan
 Howa Type 96
 Mk 19 grenade launcher
 Mk 47 Striker
 Type 87 grenade launcher
 List of Russian weaponry
 Comparison of automatic grenade launchers

References

External links

 

Automatic grenade launchers
Grenade launchers of Russia
KBP Instrument Design Bureau products
Degtyarev Plant products